Amanda Lee Aday (born January 21, 1981) is an American actress, best known for her recurring role as Dora Mae Dreifuss on the first season of the HBO series Carnivàle (2003–05).

Early life and family
Born in New York City, Aday is the daughter of singer and actor Meat Loaf and Leslie Aday, and half-sister of singer Pearl Aday. She attended Stagedoor Manor, a summer theatre/dance camp in the Catskill Mountains in the Appalachians (New York), from 1990 through 1996, and then graduated from Idyllwild Arts Academy, a private school located in Idyllwild (Riverside County, California). She then majored in theatre at the California Institute of the Arts, a private university located in Valencia (Santa Clarita, California). In 2020 Aday started a cooking channel on YouTube called All Access Eats.

Acting career
Aday's film roles include Crazy in Alabama, The Mummy An' The Armadillo, South Dakota: A Woman's Right To Choose and The Trials of Cate McCall. In addition to her work on Carnivàle, she has guest starred on the hit TV shows Boston Public, ER, Private Practice, and My Name Is Earl.

Filmography

References

External links

 
 Amanda Aday Fans – Unofficial website dedicated to Amanda

1981 births
Living people
American stage actresses
American television actresses
Actresses from New York City
California Institute of the Arts alumni
20th-century American actresses
21st-century American actresses